Geoffrey Pymar (born 14 February 1912 Eye, Suffolk, England - died 2002) was an international motorcycle speedway rider who rode in the World Championship final in 1938.

Career
Pymar was the son of a farmer. After first racing motorcycles in 1931, he took up speedway in 1933, racing at Norwich that year. Pymar started his career with the Norwich Stars, a non-league outfit, spotted by Wimbledon Dons and rode at the Wimbledon Stadium for seven seasons until the outbreak of World War II. In 1938 he was part of the Wimbledon team that won the National Trophy. Also in 1938 he competed in the World Championship Final at Wembley Stadium. In 1934, 1935 and 1939 Pymar represented England in Test Matches.

After the war he joined New Cross Rangers and in 1948 was a member of their National League Championship winning team. In 1949 he joined the Harringay Racers for a fee of over £1,200. The following season the newly promoted Bristol Bulldogs paid the Racers £1,000 for Pymar's services.

Pymar stayed with Bulldogs until they closed in 1955 and he was expected to retire. However, in 1956 he joined the Norwich Stars and rode for two seasons. He did not ride in 1958 or 1959 but in 1960 he was signed by the Yarmouth Bloaters in the newly formed Provincial League. The Bloaters lasted just one season but Pymar was approached by the Middlesbrough Bears to ride for them. After starting the season with the Bears, the travelling became too much and Pymar was transferred to the Wolverhampton Wolves. He had one final season with the Bradford Panthers in 1962 before he finally retired.

World Final appearances 
 1938 -  London, Wembley Stadium - 16th - 7pts

After retirement
Pymar became a golf caddy and was regularly seen on the tour with Tony Jacklin. In 2002 he was voted as President of the Veteran Speedway Riders Association but died whilst in office.

Players cigarette cards
Pymar is listed as number 38 of 50 in the 1930s Player's cigarette card collection.

References 

1912 births
2002 deaths
British speedway riders
Wimbledon Dons riders
Bristol Bulldogs riders
New Cross Rangers riders
Harringay Racers riders
Wolverhampton Wolves riders
Norwich Stars riders
Yarmouth Bloaters riders